Eric John Palmer (born 16 June 1931) is a former English cricketer.  Palmer was a left-handed batsman who bowled left-arm fast-medium.  He was born at Romford, Essex.

Palmer played Second XI cricket for Essex in 1955, as well as making a single appearance for Berkshire in that seasons Minor Counties Championship against Devon.  He played for the Essex Second XI the following season, before making his first-class debut for Essex in the 1957 County Championship against Gloucestershire.  He made three further first-class appearances in that season, against Surrey, Somerset and Gloucestershire.  In what was to be his only first-class appearances for the county, Palmer took 7 wickets at an average of 32.14, with best figures of 2/35.  With the bat he scored a total of 39 runs, with a high score of 11 not out.  Over the coming decade he played infrequently for the Essex Second XI, playing his final matches for them in 1967.

References

External links
Eric Palmer at ESPNcricinfo
Eric Palmer at CricketArchive

1931 births
Living people
People from Romford
English cricketers
Berkshire cricketers
Essex cricketers